A Ray of Light (Spanish: Un rayo de luz) is a 1960 Spanish musical film directed by Luis Lucia. It was the first movie to star singer and actress Marisol. It skyrocketed her to fame. Also for this film Marisol won the award to best child actress at the Venice Film Festival,

Cast
 Marisol
 María Mahor
 Joaquín Roa
 María Isbert
 José S. Isbert
 María José Goyanes
 Mercedes Borqué
 Anselmo Duarte

Music 
 Santa Lucia (by Marisol)
 Llorando y mirando al cielo (by Marisol)
 Adiós al colegio (by Marisol)
 Canciones (by Marisol)
 Verdiales (by Marisol)
 Nana italiana (by Marisol)
 Corre, corre, caballito (by Marisol)
 Paso firme (by Marisol)
 El currucucú (by Marisol)
 Dos estrellas (by Marisol)
 Rubita (by Dolores Pérez a.k.a. Lily Berchman)
 El baile (unknown performer)
 (Unknown title - by Rafaela de Córdoba)

References

External links 
 

Films directed by Luis Lucia
1960s Spanish-language films
1960 in Spain
1960 films
1960 musical comedy films
Spanish musical comedy films
1960s Spanish films